Ernest Miller is an actor and former professional wrestler.

Ernest Miller may also refer to:

Punch Miller (1894–1971), American musician
Ernest Miller (victim), one of Jeffrey Dahmer's victims
Ernest Miller (cinematographer) (1885–1957), American cinematographer
Ernest M. Miller, justice of the Iowa Supreme Court
Ernest Miller (politician) (1869–1924), Canadian politician
Ernest R. Miller, American educator and coach of football, basketball, and baseball